Saburtalo is an administrative district (raioni) in Tbilisi, capital of Georgia.

Saburtalo District includes the neighborhoods of Delisi, Vedzisi, Vashlijvari, Bakhtrioni, Khiliani, Didi Dighomi, and Zurgovana.

Vashlijvari

Vashlijvari (lit. the "apple cross") is a neighborhood of Saburtalo District of the Georgian capital city Tbilisi. Vashlijvari is located on the right side of the river Mtkvari, between Saburtalo district and Dighomi and it's situated nearby to Dighomi Massive I Block, and close to Dighomi Massive II Block. A village formerly, Vashlijvari joined Tbilisi in 1972. Vashlijvari has been developed since the 1980s.

References

Districts of Tbilisi